Saint-Hippolyte-du-Fort is a commune in the Gard department, Occitania, southern France. The town has a silk museum and barracks.

Population

In literature
A book titled 'Divided Loyalties' described life in the commune and the area during the Second World War as experienced by Janet Teissier du Cros and family.

See also
Communes of the Gard department

References

Communes of Gard